Peanut Monument may refer to:

State Peanut Monument (List of Georgia state symbols) in Turner County, Georgia on the west side of Interstate Highway 75 within the limits of the city of Ashburn, Georgia
Peanut Monument at the Dothan, Alabama Visitor Information Center, proclaiming Dothan as the "Peanut Capital of the World"